Sid Richardson (1891–1959) was a Texas businessman and philanthropist known for his association with the city of Fort Worth.

Sid Richardson may also refer to:

 Sid Richardson Auditorium of the Amon Carter Museum in Fort Worth, Texas
 Sid Richardson College, one of eleven residential colleges at Rice University, Houston, Texas
 Sid Richardson Museum, in Fort Worth housing Sid Richardson's extensive collection of Western Art featuring works by Remington and Russell 
 Sid Richardson Scout Ranch, a Boy Scout camp on Lake Bridgeport, near Decatur, Texas
 Sid W. Richardson Visual Arts Center at Fort Worth Country Day School